"Amor" is a song by Argentine band Los Auténticos Decadentes, originally released in 2000 as part of their seventh studio album Hoy trasnoche. In 2018 they released a single featuring Chilean singer Mon Laferte, which was released on July 20, 2018, through PopArt as part of Los Auténticos Decadentes live album Fiesta Nacional (MTV Unplugged). The song was written by Jorge Serrano and produced by Los Auténticos Decadentes, Gustavo Borner, Moska Lorenzo and Mariano Franceschelli.

Personnel 
Credits adapted from "Amor" liner notes.

Vocals

 Mon Laferte – lead vocals
Los Auténticos Decadentes

Gustavo "Cucho" Parisi - vocals
Jorge Serrano - guitars, vocals, choirs and pinkillo
Diego Demarco - guitars, vocals, choirs
Nito Montecchia- guitars, choirs
Gastón "Francés" Bernardou - percussion, effects and synthesisers
Martín "La Mosca" Lorenzo - percussion and choirs
Daniel Zimbello - trombone
Pablo Armesto - bass guitar and choirs
Pablo Rodriguez - saxophone, flute and pincullo
Eduardo Tripodi - percussion and choirs
Mariano Franceschelli - drums, bass guitar, percussion and choirs
Guillermo "Capanga" Eijo - trumpet and choirs

Production

Los Auténticos Decadentes – production
Gustavo Borner – production
Moska Lorenzo – production
Mariano Franceschelli – production

Charts

Weekly charts

Year-end charts

References

External links
Lyrics of this song at Genius

2000 songs
2018 songs
2018 singles
Mon Laferte songs